An Evening with Harry Belafonte and Friends is a live album by Harry Belafonte, released in 1997. The album is the soundtrack of a concert, televised by PBS in March 1997. It was also released as a concert video. In 2003 the concert video was also released on DVD.

Track listing
 "We Are the Wave" (Jake Holmes, Richard Cummings, The Soul Brothers) – 3:52
 "Turn the World Around" (Harry Belafonte, Robert Freedman) – 6:14
 "Island in the Sun" (Lord Burgess, Harry Belafonte) – 4:36
 "Skin to Skin" (Holmes, Godfrey Nelson) – 4:44
 "Kwela (Listen to the Man)" (Holmes, S. M. Nkabinda) – 5:33
 "Eyala" (Richard Bona) – 3:46
 "Matilda" (Norman Span) – 9:50
 "Dangerous Times" (Holmes) – 4:50
 "Try to Remember" (Tom Jones, Harvey Schmidt) – 4:29
 "Paradise in Gazankulu" (Holmes, Oben Ngobeni) – 7:15
 "Eyando" (Bona) – 3:02
"Jamaica Farewell" (Burgess) – 6:44
"Day-O (The Banana Boat Song)" (William Attaway, Irving Burgie) – 7:40

Personnel
Harry Belafonte – vocals
Richard Bona – solos on "Eyala" and "Eyando", guitar
Mamadou Ba – bass
Morris Goldberg – woodwinds
Dan Carillo – guitar
Domonic Kanza – guitar
Galen "Lenny" Underwood – keyboards, background vocals
James R. Sebastian – drums
Edison Da Silva – percussion
Emedin Rivera – percussion
LaTanya Hall – background vocals
Gwendolyn Jackson – background vocals
Sam McKelton – background vocals
Fluitt – background vocals
Production notes:
David Belafonte – producer, engineer, mixing
Harry Belafonte – executive producer, liner notes
Kooster McCallister – engineer
Michael Halsband – photography
Joanne Savio – photography

References

Collaborative albums
Harry Belafonte live albums
1997 live albums
Island Records live albums